Juan Alvarez (born August 30, 2004) is an American professional soccer player who plays as a midfielder for MLS Next Pro club Tacoma Defiance.

Club career
Born in Walla Walla, Washington, Alvarez began his career with Pacific Northwest Soccer Club before joining the youth setup at Major League Soccer club Seattle Sounders FC in 2016. In March 2021, it was reported that Alvarez would join the Seattle Sounders FC first team bubble for the club's pre-season. On April 10, 2021, Alvarez scored his first goal with the first team, a second half strike against San Diego Loyal at Lumen Field in a 1–0 victory.

On May 7, 2021, Alvarez signed a contract with Tacoma Defiance, an affiliate club of Seattle Sounders FC. He made his professional debut for the club in the USL Championship on May 9, 2021 against LA Galaxy II. Alvarez started the match and played the whole first half as Tacoma drew 1–1.

On July 7, 2021, Alvarez was loaned to Seattle Sounders FC on a 4-day hardship deal. He made the bench but did not appear in the Sounders' win against Houston Dynamo on July 8.

International career
Alvarez has been selected into the United States squads at the under-15 and under-17 levels. He made his debut for the under-17s on February 19, 2020 in a friendly against Spain, coming on as a substitute in the 2–1 defeat.

Career statistics

References

External links
 Profile at Seattle Sounders FC

2004 births
Living people
Sportspeople from Washington (state)
American soccer players
Association football midfielders
Tacoma Defiance players
USL Championship players
Soccer players from Washington (state)
United States men's youth international soccer players
Seattle Sounders FC players
MLS Next Pro players